The 2014 Molson Coors Tankard, the Nova Scotia men's provincial curling championship, was held from February 5 to 9 at the Halifax Curling Club in Halifax, Nova Scotia. The winning team of Jamie Murphy represented Nova Scotia at the 2014 Tim Hortons Brier in Kamloops, British Columbia.

Teams

Round-robin standings
Final round-robin standings

Round-robin results

Draw 1
Wednesday, February 5, 1:00pm

Draw 2
Wednesday, February 5, 6:00pm

Draw 3
Thursday, February 6, 9:00am

Draw 4
Thursday, February 6, 2:00pm

Draw 5
Thursday, February 6, 7:00pm

Draw 6
Friday, February 7, 2:00pm

Draw 7
Friday, February 7, 7:00pm

Playoffs

1 vs. 2
Saturday, February  08, 2:00pm

3 vs. 4
Saturday, February  08, 2:00pm

Semifinal
Saturday, February  08, 7:00pm

Final
Sunday, February  09, 2:00pm

References

Curling in Nova Scotia
Molson Coors Tankard
Sport in Halifax, Nova Scotia
Molson Coors Tankard
Molson Coors Tankard